Ibo loa or Igbo loa, are a type of loa, of African origin, revered in Haiti. These loa are linked to the Igbo people.  They are considered to be both stern and gentle, while the Petro or Vodou loa tend to be one or the other respectively.

See also
 Igbo culture

References

Igbo religion